Faya can refer to:

Faya (duo), a female R&B duo from West London
Faya!, 2005 album by the reggae musician O-Shen
Faya-Largeau, a city in Chad
Myrica faya, a plant species

People
Zhu Faya or Faya, Chinese Buddhist monk of the Jin dynasty
Vybrant Faya, Ghanaian musician
Alberto Faya, Cuban singer and musician